Bartley Glacier is a hanging glacier on the south wall of Wright Valley in the Asgard Range of Victoria Land, just west of Meserve Glacier. It was named by the Advisory Committee on Antarctic Names for construction driver Ollie B. Bartley, U.S. Navy, who was killed on January 14, 1957 when the vehicle (weasel) he was driving dropped through the sea ice at Hut Point, McMurdo Sound.

See also
 List of glaciers in the Antarctic
 Glaciology

References
 

Glaciers of the Asgard Range
Glaciers of McMurdo Dry Valleys